Alfred and John Bool were a pair of British brothers who photographed 19th century London.

Life and work 

Alfred Henry Bool (1844-1926) and John James Bool (1850-1933) were both born in London. They opened a photo studio together in Pimlico in the 1860s, and John Bool worked there until 1918.

In 1875 the brothers were hired by Alfred Marks, the director of the Society for Photographing Relics of Old London, and would go on to photograph historic buildings including the  Oxford Arms Inn, Lincoln's Inn, the Smithfield area, Temple Bar, Gray's Inn, St. Bartholomew's and the Cloth Fair. The album prints were made by the brothers in the company of Henry Dixon.

In 1977, works by Alfred & John Bool and Henry Dixon were shown at the documenta 6 art exhibition in Kassel, Germany.

Further reading 
Old London: photographed by Henry Dixon and Alfred & John Bool for the Society for Photographing Relics of Old London, 1975

References 

19th-century English photographers
Art duos
Photographers from London